(Citrus unshiu × sinensis) is a Japanese citrus fruit that is a hybrid of a Miyagawa Wase mikan and an orange. The new breed was the first tangor created in Japan in 1949. It was named Kiyomi after the temple  and the lagoon  near its experiment station in Shizuoka city and registered as "Tangor Nōrin No.1" in 1979.

Kiyomi are sweet. Sugar content is normally 11–12° Bx and reaches even 13 °Bx if conditions are met. Citric acid content is around 1%. It has no seeds. The time of ripening is mid to late March. The flavor is similar to that of a mikan, while the aroma is similar to that of an orange.

Kiyomi is a monogerm, so it is often used as a parent citrus to create new hybrids such as dekopon.

References

External links

Kiyomi at the National Agriculture and Food Research Organization 

Japanese fruit
Citrus hybrids
Citrus